The list shows incumbent and past Chief Justices of Patna High Court, the High Court of the state of Bihar. In Indian legal jurisdiction, High Courts are instituted as constitutional courts under the Indian Constitution.

See also
 List of High Courts of India
 Patna High Court

References

Bihar-related lists
 
P